Worst Best Friends is an Australian children's television series first screened on Network Ten in 2002. The series is based on the children's books by Max Dann: Adventures with My Worst Best Friend, Going Bananas and Dusting in Love.

Plot summary
Roger Thesaurus has a problem. His two best friends are worst enemies. Dusting, who is rough and disgusting has forced his way to become Roger's best friend but Roger already had a best friend, Millicent, who is bossy. The two best friends constantly fight for Roger's attention, while he copes with parents who have decided to separate.

KEY AWARDS AND FESTIVAL SCREENINGS:Banff World Television Festival (2003)and nominated for a BANFF and Screen Producers Association of Australia (2003) and nominated for an AFI Award (Best Children's Television Drama 2003)

Cast list
Cameron Attard as Roger Thesaurus
Seychelle Brown as Millicent
Raymond Mirams as Ernest Dusting
Lee Cormie as Gilbert
Andrew S. Gilbert as Mr Thesaurus
Christen O'Leary as Mrs Thesaurus
Jessica Jacobs as Molly
Joshua Jay as Max
Masih. A as Trevor 
Rebecca Hetherington as Avril
Andrew "Milton" Hobbs as himself
Jan Friedl as Miss Hodgson
Arunabha Keshari as Kay
Rebekah Tipping as Loretta
Nadja Kostich as Avril's Mother
Amy Latimer as Phoebe
Angus McLaren as Eddie
Maxwell Simon as Douglas Grotty
Justin B. Knight as himself
Sara Weinstein
Andrew "Milton" Hobbs as himself

Episodes

See also
 List of Australian television series

References

External links

Network 10 original programming
Australian children's television series
Australian comedy television series
2002 Australian television series debuts
2002 Australian television series endings
Television shows set in Melbourne